Ryan Sachire is currently the Callaghan Family Head Men's Tennis Coach at the University of Notre Dame. He was previously an American professional tennis player who captured 2 ATP Challenger doubles titles.

Early life 

Ryan Sachire was born April 2, 1978 in Youngstown, Ohio. He is from Canfield, Ohio and graduated from Canfield High School (Ohio) in 1996. While playing for Canfield he only lost 5 matches and won 2 Ohio state singles titles. He was ranked 24th in the USTA nationally for 16&under singles. His father, Frank Sachire, was a former offensive tackle for Mount Union College and had a brief stint in the NFL. He presently coaches tennis in Youngstown, Ohio and the surrounding area.

Collegiate tennis career 

Sachire played his college tennis for Notre Dame and compiled a 138-43 record at first singles and 73-32 at first doubles. He reached the ITA national championship final in 1998 and lost to James Blake. He also won the consolation in 1999 and reached the semis of the national clay court championships the same year. He was a 3 time ITA Midwest Championships semifinalist and was runner-up in 1996. He was a 3 time member of the USTA summer college team. Sachire is in the top-5 in 13 different categories for Notre Dame. He is 2nd with 211 combined wins and lead the Irish to a 67-33 record and a 16th-place finish in 1997. They were 1999 Big East champs and in the top-35 for 4 years with 4 tournament bids. He was 2 time conference MVP and Midwest Player of the Year. He was top rookie in 1997 and 4 time team MVP. He graduated in 2000 after studying economics and was a 2 time Big East Academic All-Star. He is first and only Notre Dame player to win 30-plus singles matches in 4 seasons and 1 of 2 to get 4 NCAA Singles Championship invitations. He was a 3 time All-American, always in the top-40 in singles and spent a great deal of time at #2 behind Harvard's James Blake (5th in the world). He won all of the ITA senior awards in 2000 being senior player of the year and winning several other awards.

Professional tennis career 

After graduating from Notre Dame, he played professionally for 5 years. He was ranked 184th in doubles and 391st in singles in the Association of Tennis Professionals. He won 16 doubles titles, 14 of which were futures and 2 challengers (2002 Waco and 2003 Atlantic City). He won 3 singles futures titles (College Station 1998, St. Joseph 2002, and Lachine Canada 2003). He was in the top 35 among U.S. men in both singles and doubles. His record from January 2001-December 2008 is 128 - 92. Notable singles opponents include Bob Bryan, Wayne Odesnik, Kevin Kim, Amer Delic, and Dmitry Tursunov. He played two doubles finals against Bob and Mike Bryan, as his most notable opponents.

Last ATP Match 
Indianapolis, IN, USA | March 12, 2008 | R56 | $100,000 | Hard

Last Competition Result 
R32|$50,000|Challenger, Hard | Entry:(q)

Coaching career 

He began his coaching career at Wickertree Tennis & Fitness Center in Columbus, Ohio. He then was at Baylor as an assistant from 2005–2006 and has been coaching at Notre Dame ever since, first as an assistant before stepping into the head coaching role in 2013. In 2006, Sachire married Cindy Harding, a 1999 Irish graduate and former cheerleader. In February 2010, Ryan was inducted into the Canfield Hall of Fame for his accomplishments as the best tennis player to ever have played for the Cardinals.

References

Sources 
http://www.atpworldtour.com/tennis/3/en/players/playerprofiles/?playersearch=sachire&x=0&y=0
http://und.cstv.com/sports/m-tennis/mtt/sachire_ryan00.html
http://und.cstv.com/sports/m-tennis/spec-rel/070208aab.html
http://www.ncaa.com/tennis-mens/article.aspx?id=278616
http://www.postgazette.com/sports/notebooks/20020519tennotes8.asp
http://baylorbears.cstv.com/sports/m-tennis/mtt/sachire_ryan00.html

1978 births
Living people
American male tennis players
Sports coaches from Ohio
Notre Dame Fighting Irish men's tennis players
Notre Dame Fighting Irish men's tennis coaches
Sportspeople from Youngstown, Ohio
Tennis people from Ohio
People from Granger, Indiana
Tennis coaches from Indiana
People from Canfield, Ohio
Baylor Bears men's tennis coaches